KOTOR or KOTR may refer to:

Korea On The Rocks
King of the Ring
King of the Ronalds
King of the Road (disambiguation)
 King of the Railway
 Kings of the Rollers
Knights of the Old Republic (disambiguation)
Knights of the Round (disambiguation)
KOTR-LD, a low-power television station (channel 7, virtual 11) licensed to serve Monterey, California, United States
KAAP-LP, a defunct low-power television station (channel 2) formerly licensed to serve Santa Cruz, California, which held the call sign KOTR-LP from 2005 to 2018
KOTR (FM), an Online Radio Station.